The 1942 Bulgarian State Football Championship was the 18th season of the Bulgarian State Football Championship.

Defending champions were Slavia Sofia. It was contested by 22 teams, and Levski Sofia won the championship, as well as its first domestic double. Besides teams from the present borders of Bulgaria, the 1942 season also involved teams from the areas under Bulgarian administration during much of World War II. The football clubs from Prilep, Bitola and Skopje in Vardar Macedonia took part in the competition, with Makedonia Skopie even reaching the final.

First round

|}

Second round

|}

Quarter-finals

|}

Semi-finals

|}

Final

First game

Second game

Levski Sofia won 3–0 on aggregate.

References
Bulgaria - List of final tables (RSSSF)

Bulgarian State Football Championship seasons
1
1